Clear Channel UK is the British division of iHeartMedia, a global media conglomerate based in San Antonio, Texas, United States of America. It operates through a complex group structure, with some 70 UK subsidiary companies.

As with its U.S. parent, the entertainment division is no longer part of Clear Channel UK, but is now a separate subsidiary, known as Live Nation UK that is part of a separate company, Live Nation which is no longer owned by iHeartMedia.

Clear Channel UK
Clear Channel UK is an Out of Home media owner, operating over 40,000 advertising sites across the UK. These sites include classic Adshel 6-sheet posters, digital Adshel Live 6-sheet posters, digital 6-sheet screens and large format screens at malls nationwide, as well as Sainsbury's and Asda supermarkets, and smaller Socialite screens in pubs and bars; classic billboards, digital Wrap billboards, and large format digital Storm sites.

Corporate Structure

Relation to ClearChannel Group Structure
Clear Channel has 3 main UK holding companies (highlighted in red on the table below), all of which are wholly owned subsidiaries of ClearChannel International Holdings BV, registered in the Netherlands.

The Netherlands company is a wholly owned subsidiary of Clear Channel Communications Inc, which is listed on the New York Stock Exchange.

List of Main UK subsidiaries

This information was modified from the original information taken from the UK Companies Database in April 2005, and re-ordered to show the relationships between holding companies and subsidiaries more clearly. Companies previously associated with Clear Channel Entertainment have been removed as they were spun off into a separate company now associated with "Live Nation".  Each company's subsidiaries are displayed directly below it. Each line shows, in the following order:

 Number of holding companies. This shows the 'level of ownership' of the company - the number of holding companies between it and iHeartMedia, the main Clear Channel company which is listed on the New York Stock Exchange. Clear Channel Entertainment UK Limited (shown in red) is held by 2 'parent' companies - ClearChannel International Holdings BV, registered in the Netherlands, and Clear Channel Communications Inc, which is listed on the New York Stock Exchange. Their subsidiaries (in dark grey) have 3 holding (parent) companies. Their subsidiaries (light grey) have 4 holding companies, and so forth.
 Number of subsidiary companies. This table only shows the main subsidiary companies. Some of the light grey companies have many subsidiaries which are listed in the table below. This layout is intended to make the table clearer.
 Notes from the Companies Database indicating the company's purpose.

The information given in the Companies Database is not fully up to date - companies normally have a time window in which to file documents, and even when filed, the documents may take some time to become available on the database. Both tables only include active companies. Companies officially designated as 'dormant' or 'wound up' are not shown in the table, but are counted as 'subsidiaries' in the table above. This is why some companies in the table above will show more subsidiaries than are included in the table below.

List of Minor UK subsidiaries

External links
  Clear Channel UK
 Clear Channel International

IHeartMedia